The Black Hills are a mountain range in the Mojave Desert, in northwestern San Bernardino County, California.

They are a continuation of the Black Hills (Kern County).

References 

Mountain ranges of the Mojave Desert
Mountain ranges of San Bernardino County, California
Hills of California
Mountain ranges of Southern California